The 2018 Southern Conference softball tournament was held at UNCG Softball Stadium on the campus of the University of North Carolina at Greensboro in Greensboro, North Carolina, from May 9 through May 12, 2018.  won their first-ever tournament championship and earned the SoCon's automatic bid to the 2018 NCAA Division I softball tournament.

Bracket

References

Southern Conference Tournament
Southern Conference softball tournament
Southern Conference Tournament